Joseph Augustine Di Noia  (born July 10, 1943) is an American member of the Dominican Order who is a Roman Catholic archbishop and theologian. Since 2013 he has been Adjunct Secretary of the Congregation for the Doctrine of the Faith. He has held several other positions in the Roman Curia since 2002.

Early life and education
Born in the New York City borough of the Bronx, Di Noia was baptized at the Capuchin-run Immaculate Conception Church on Gun Hill Road. He was raised in the Wakefield section of the borough.

Di Noia graduated with a bachelor's degree from Providence College in 1965 and entered the Dominican Province of St. Joseph. He went on to study philosophy at the order's faculty for philosophical formation at St. Stephen's Priory in Dover, Massachusetts, and then pursued his theological formation at the Dominican House of Studies in Washington, D.C.  He was ordained on June 4, 1970, having earned a Master of Divinity and Bachelor of Sacred Theology degree in 1969. He went on to earn a Licentiate of Sacred Theology from the Dominican House of Studies in 1971 and a Ph.D. in religious studies from Yale University in 1980 with a dissertation entitled "Catholic Theology of Religions and Interreligious Dialogue".

Early career
Before beginning work on his doctorate at Yale, Di Noia served as an instructor of theology and assistant chaplain at Providence College from 1971–1974. After completing his doctorate, he returned to the Dominican House of Studies in 1980 and became a professor of systematic theology, a post he held until 1993. During his time there, he was also editor of The Thomist and was a founding director of the Intercultural Forum for Faith & Culture at the Saint John Paul II National Shrine.

From 1993 until 2001, Di Noia served as the executive director of the Secretariat for Doctrine & Pastoral Practices at the United States Conference of Catholic Bishops, headquartered in Washington, D.C. Di Noia served on the International Theological Commission from 1997 until 2002 and received the title of Master of Sacred Theology from the Order of Preachers in 1998.

From 2001–2002 he served as a visiting professor at St. Joseph's Seminary in Yonkers, New York.

Roman Curia assignments 
He began his career in the Roman Curia when Pope John Paul II appointed him Under Secretary of the Congregation for the Doctrine of the Faith on April 4, 2002.

On June 16, 2009, Pope Benedict XVI appointed him Secretary of the Congregation for Divine Worship and the Discipline of the Sacraments and titular Archbishop of Oregon City. He received episcopal consecration on July 11, 2009, at the Basilica of the National Shrine of the Immaculate Conception in Washington, D.C. Cardinal William Levada was the principal consecrator and Archbishops Donald Wuerl and Thomas C. Kelly, O.P. served as principal co–consecrators. When he was reassigned after just three years, he said he was  "flabbergasted".

On June 26, 2012, Pope Benedict XVI appointed him Vice President of the Pontifical Commission Ecclesia Dei, serving under his former superior, Cardinal William Levada, who was its president. The commission was charged with overseeing the talks between the Holy See and the followers of the late, excommunicated, traditionalist Archbishop Marcel Lefebvre, principally members of the Society of Saint Pius X led by Bishop Bernard Fellay.

On September 21, 2013, Pope Francis named him Adjunct Secretary of the Congregation for the Doctrine of the Faith.

Books
The Diversity of Religions: A Christian Perspective (Catholic University of America Press, 1992)
The Love That Never Ends: A Key to the Catechism of the Catholic Church (Our Sunday Visitor Press, 1996).
Grace in Season: The Riches of the Gospel in Seventy Sermons (Cluny Media, 2019).

See also
 
 List of heads of the diplomatic missions of the Holy See

References

External links

Dominican House of Studies, Washington, D.C.

1943 births
Living people
People from the Bronx
American Dominicans
Providence College alumni
Dominican House of Studies alumni
Dominican theologians
Dominican bishops
Providence College faculty
Dominican House of Studies faculty
21st-century American Roman Catholic titular archbishops
Members of the Congregation for Divine Worship and the Discipline of the Sacraments
International Theological Commission
21st-century American Roman Catholic theologians
Yale Divinity School alumni
20th-century American Roman Catholic priests
Catholics from New York (state)
Officials of the Roman Curia